Events in the year 1914 in Spain.

Incumbents
Monarch: Alfonso XIII
President of the Government: Eduardo Dato

Births

Narciso Perales (d. 1993)

References

 
Years of the 20th century in Spain
1910s in Spain
Spain
Spain